Amaya Arzuaga (born in Lerma (Burgos), in 1970), is a Spanish designer.

She studied in the UPM and in 1992 she finished Fashion Design and  joined her parents' enterprise, Elipse.

In 1994, she created her own firm. She sells and shows her collections regularly in international fashion fairs like Atmosphère (Paris), Fashion Cotterie (New York), Camera Nazionale della Moda Italiana (Milan), Pasarela Cibeles (Madrid),  Passarel·la Gaudí (Barcelona), and London Fashion Week (London). Amaya Arzuaga has more than 200 boutiques in Spain.

Prizes
Magacines Telva, Elle, Woman
Empresaria joven de Expansión
Arte de Vivi
Primer Premio Cibeles
Medalla de oro al mérito en las Bellas Artes de 2005

External links
Website

Biography (in Spanish)

1970 births
Living people
Spanish fashion designers
Spanish women fashion designers